The Arbër Highway part of SH61 and SH6 is a single carriageway highway that is being constructed between Albania and North Macedonia. The highway is planned to stretch along an ancient caravan route passing through the eastern highlands of Tirana along SH61, and ending at the current SH6 in Diber County.

See also
A1 motorway (Albania)
Transport in Albania

References

External links
Arber Highway on Rruga e Arberit Newspaper

Roads in Albania
Roads in North Macedonia
Transport in Tirana County
Pan-European Corridor VIII
Proposed transport infrastructure in Albania